01932 is the national dialling code for Weybridge in the United Kingdom.  Before PhONEday,  the area code was 0932. The mnemonic for 0932 corresponds with WE 2, where "WE" is taken from the letters W and E in Weybridge.

In common with all other British area codes, the initial '0' is a trunk prefix that is not required when dialling from abroad.

Coverage
The dialling code contains seven telephone exchanges, which serve a mostly urban and suburban area in the north west of Surrey on the outskirts of Greater London, centred on the town of Weybridge.

A telephone exchange previously existed in Longcross but its numbers were absorbed into the Chertsey exchange in the early 1970s.

Settlements served by the dialling code include: Addlestone, Byfleet, Chertsey, Cobham, Longcross, New Haw, Ottershaw, Shepperton, Stoke d'Abernon, Sunbury-on-Thames, Upper Halliford, Walton-on-Thames, Weybridge, Wisley.

History

The Esher charge group contained two STD codes – 0932 with its Group switching centre (GSC) in Weybridge and 0372 with its GSC in Esher.
Weybridge exchanges were not originally arranged in a linked numbering scheme, resulting in the necessity of local dialling codes to dial between exchanges. During the 1980s, the exchanges gradually became part of a linked numbering scheme with the STD code 0932 and the original 4 and 5 figure numbers became 6 figure.

Calls from the Esher charge group were charged at local rate to telephone exchanges in the following STD codes:

Telephone exchanges in 0486 were gradually transferred into 0483, and added to the Guildford linked numbering scheme.

Former local dialling codes
From London:

Local dialling codes for Weybridge exchanges were translated into routing digits by the directors in London telephone exchanges. The combined length of a local dialling code and number on the exchange was always 7 figures.

From Guildford:

Direct connections were provided between Guildford and Byfleet, Cobham, Walton-on-Thames, and Weybridge exchanges. Calls to other exchanges were routed via Weybridge. The unpublished dialling codes 9733, 9736, and 9732 would also have worked for Byfleet, Cobham, and Walton-on-Thames respectively in 1963 with the call routed via Weybridge. 

From Slough:

From Bagshot & Camberley:

Cobham and Walton-on-Thames had been incorporated into the Weybridge linked numbering scheme by 1984. Their previous dialling codes would have been 926 and 922 respectively.

From Walton-on-Thames:

Walton-on-Thames was a very well interconnected telephone exchange with a tidy arrangement of local dialling codes: 9 was the code for its parent Weybridge; 8 was the code for a direct connection to Esher; 5x were the codes for direct connections to other non-director exchanges; 6x were the codes for direct connections to nearby London director exchanges.

Calls to HOUnslow and ISLeworth London director exchanges were routed via Weybridge exchange. Calls to LOWer Hook exchange were routed via Esher exchange.

Other London director exchanges were reached by dialling 7 and the first three letters of the exchange name followed by the 4 figure number. E.g. for a call to WHItehall 1212, dial "7 WHI 1212".

References

1932
Surrey
Weybridge, Surrey